In Greek mythology, Thoas (Ancient Greek: Θόας, "fleet, swift") was a prince of Corinth who succeeded his father Ornytion to the throne.

Family 
Thoas and his brother Phocus, the eponymous founder of Phocis, were the sons of King Ornytion, who was the son of Sisyphus. According to Corinthian tradition, Thoas and his descendants continued to rule Corinth until the coming of the Heraclids.

Mythology 
According to the geographer Pausanias, Thoas remained in Corinth, succeeding his father as its ruler, while his brother Phocus led a colony to Tithorea. Thoas was the father of Damophon, Damophon of Propodas, and Propodas of Doridas and Hyanthidas. During the reign of the latter two, Corinth was seized by the Dorians under the command of Aletes, son of Hippotes. The brothers handed control of Corinth to him and were allowed to remain in the city, while the rest of the people were expelled.

Notes

References 
 Grimal, Pierre, The Dictionary of Classical Mythology, Wiley-Blackwell, 1996. .
 Hard, Robin, The Routledge Handbook of Greek Mythology: Based on H.J. Rose's "Handbook of Greek Mythology", Psychology Press, 2004, . Google Books.
 Liddell, Henry George, Robert Scott. A Greek-English Lexicon. Revised and augmented throughout by Sir Henry Stuart Jones with the assistance of. Roderick McKenzie. Oxford. Clarendon Press. 1940. Online version at the Perseus Digital Library.
 Parada, Carlos, Genealogical Guide to Greek Mythology, Jonsered, Paul Åströms Förlag, 1993. .
 Pausanias, Description of Greece with an English Translation by W.H.S. Jones, Litt.D., and H.A. Ormerod, M.A., in 4 Volumes. Cambridge, MA, Harvard University Press; London, William Heinemann Ltd. 1918. . Online version at the Perseus Digital Library
Pausanias, Graeciae Descriptio. 3 vols. Leipzig, Teubner. 1903.  Greek text available at the Perseus Digital Library.

Princes in Greek mythology
Kings of Corinth
Kings in Greek mythology
Corinthian characters in Greek mythology
Corinthian mythology